Jaigaon is a census town in Alipurduar subdivision under Kalchini Block of Alipurduar district in the state of West Bengal, India. It is located on the country's border with Bhutan, and Bhutan Gate separates the two countries. Phuentsholing is the Bhutan's nearest city to Jaigaon. Bhutan does not have domestic roads linking to all its towns, so uses roads passing through Jaigaon to reach such destinations as Samtse, Gomtu, Nganglam and Samdrup Jongkhar.

NGO's 
Youth Sporting Club (Deokata Toll) 

Jaigaon Bless Foundation

Geography

Location 

Jaigaon has a hilly and slopey terrain. The town is situated at the India-Bhutan border with Phuentsholing. There are several streams coming from the uphills and joining the river Toorsa  at the downtown.
Bagdogra Airport (Siliguri) is the nearest airport, and Kolkata its nearest port, where goods to Bhutan are brought from. Hasimara is the nearest railway station. National Highway 317A in India connects Jaigaon to Hasimara. India offers a free flow of goods from Kolkata port to Bhutan. It lies on the banks of the Torsa River.

Area overview 
Alipurduar district is covered by two maps. It is an extensive area in the eastern end of the Dooars in West Bengal. It is undulating country, largely forested, with numerous rivers flowing down from the outer ranges of the Himalayas in Bhutan. It is a predominantly rural area with 79.38% of the population living in the rural areas. The district has 1 municipal town and 20 census towns and that means that 20.62% of the population lives in the urban areas. The scheduled castes and scheduled tribes, taken together, form more than half the population in all the six community development blocks in the district. There is a high concentration of tribal people (scheduled tribes) in the three northern blocks of the district.

Note: The map alongside presents some of the notable locations in the subdivision. All places marked in the map are linked in the larger full screen map.

Environment 

Jaigaon is in a small valley located near the low-lying hills of the Himalayan mountains. Jaigaon receives an abundant amount of rainfall throughout the year. The outskirts of the city are demarcated by tea gardens. The Torsa River flows at the lower end of the town. High levels of in-migration to Jaigaon from elsewhere in India has caused the environmental conditions of the city to deteriorate. To solve the problem of non-potable drinking water, various bore wells and pump stations operate around the town, adding to the problem of the decreasing water table below the town.

Demographic 
As of census 2011 India census, Jaigaon had a population of 42,254. Males constitute 51.2% of the population and females 48.8%. Jaigaon has an average literacy rate of 60.52%.

Transport

Roadways 
Jaigaon is connected to the nearby cities and towns with roads of good condition.
Taxi and jeep services access Siliguri, Alipurduar, Jalpaiguri, Mainaguri, Malbazar, Birpara, Dhupguri, Gangtok, Kalimpong, Pakyong, Hasimara, Cooch Behar, Panitanki, Jorethang, Darjeeling, Namchi, Pelling,  Thimphu-Bhutan, Phuntsholing-Bhutan etc.

Bus services connects Jaigaon with P.C. Mittal Memorial Bus Terminus, Siliguri.
Frequent buses are also available from the town to all cities/towns mentioned above.

Railway 
Hasimara Railway Station is the nearest railway station 15 Kilometres away from the town which falls under New Jalpaiguri–Alipurduar–Samuktala Road line of Northeast Frontier Railway.

Airways 
Bagdogra International Airport, Siliguri is the nearest airport from Jaigaon.

Education 

Jaigaon has several schools under various education boards of India. SHMD School is the only Central Board of Secondary Education (CBSE) school in Jaigaon. Schools like Ved Vyas, St. Dominic's, Chinary Academy, Zenith School, and Green View English School follow the state education board, whereas New Adarsh is an open board school.

Nani Bhattacharya Smarak Mahavidyalaya is an affiliated college of North Bengal University located in the vicinity of Jaigaon, and offers degrees in a variety of fields.

Many students in Jaigaon opt to pursue higher education elsewhere in West Bengal, particularly Siliguri and Kolkata.

Culture 

The lifestyle of Jaigaon is influenced by the town's diverse population of people from throughout India and Bhutan. The demand of Indian and Bhutanese consumers from nearby Phuentsholing has led to the development of the service sector in various fields.

A variety of festivals of various religions are celebrated in Jaigaon, reflecting the town's diverse demographics.

Jaigaon's cultural diversity can be seen in its food and clothing. Various segments of Indian culture are represented, and the town's proximity to Bhutan has influenced locally available commodities. For instance, Tibetan-style cuisine, such as momos are popular, while gho and kira, items of Bhutanese national dress, are produced in Jaigaon for Bhutanese consumers.

Every year various sports and other tournaments are organised in Jaigaon by various trusts and NGOs. A cricket tournament is organised every year, and a marathon is organised every January. Apart from these, various inter-school debates, quizzes and sports meets are organised. On Independence Day, students from various schools participate in events organised by the Indian Consulate to Bhutan. Also on Republic Day every year, parades and cultural programs are organised in the town.

See also 
Bhutan-India Border
Alipurduar
Kalchini

References 

Cities and towns in Alipurduar district
Bhutan–India border crossings
Twin cities
Divided cities